Hojagiri is a folk dance, performed in the state of Tripura, India by *Tripuri people of Bru Reang clan.  It is performed by women and young girls, about 4 to 6 members in a team, singing, balancing on an earthen pitcher and managing other props such as a bottle on the head and earthen lamp on the hand. while only the lower half of the body is moved.

References

Dances of Tripura

actually the folk dance is performed by Reangs/Brus peoples